Sarband-e Deh Di (also Romanized as Sarband-e Deh Dī) is a village in Hati Rural District, Hati District, Lali County, Khuzestan Province, Iran. At the 2006 census, its population was 60, in 10 families.

References 

Populated places in Lali County